Revenue Divisions are the administrative divisions in districts of some of the Indian states. These divisions are sub-divided into mandals. The mandals are in turn divided into villages and hamlets. There are 76 revenue divisions in Andhra Pradesh. Revenue Divisional Officer (RDO) is the head of the division.

List of revenue divisions 

The below table details the revenue divisions with respect to their districts.

See also 
 List of mandals in Andhra Pradesh

References

Divisions